Lobdell Estate, Minquadale Home, also known as the Minquadale Home for Aged Men, was a historic home and retirement home located at Minquadale near Wilmington, New Castle County, Delaware. It was built in 1864, and was a two and a half-story, five bays wide, stuccoed, and gable-roofed dwelling in the Italianate style.  It featured large decorative brackets and a large cupola atop the roof.  It was originally built by George Lobdell, a manufacturer of car wheels, as a summer home. In 1891, his vacation house was made over into a retirement home for Lobdell's employees of both sexes.

It was added to the National Register of Historic Places in 1973. It was demolished between 1984 and 2002.

References

External links

Historic American Buildings Survey in Delaware
Houses on the National Register of Historic Places in Delaware
Italianate architecture in Delaware
Houses completed in 1864
Houses in Wilmington, Delaware
National Register of Historic Places in Wilmington, Delaware